The Kemp Baronetcy, of Gissing in the County of Norfolk, was a title in the Baronetage of England. It was created on 14 March 1642 for Robert Kemp. The second Baronet sat as member of parliament for Norfolk and Dunwich. The third Baronet was member of parliament for Dunwich and Suffolk. The fourth Baronet was member of parliament for Orford. The title became extinct on the death of the twelfth Baronet in 1936.

Kemp baronets, of Gissing (1642)
Sir Robert Kemp, 1st Baronet (died 1647)
Sir Robert Kemp, 2nd Baronet (1627–1710)
Sir Robert Kemp, 3rd Baronet (1667–1734)
Sir Robert Kemp, 4th Baronet (1699–1752)
Sir John Kemp, 5th Baronet (1700–1761)
Sir John Kemp, 6th Baronet (1754–1771)
Sir Benjamin Kemp, 7th Baronet (1708–1777)
Sir William Kemp, 8th Baronet (1717–1799)
Sir William Robert Kemp, 9th Baronet (1744–1804)
Sir William Robert Kemp, 10th Baronet (1791–1874)
Sir Thomas John Kemp, 11th Baronet (1793–1874)
Sir Kenneth Hagar Kemp, 12th Baronet (1853–1936)

References

Extinct baronetcies in the Baronetage of England
1642 establishments in England